Edward George Lanyon (June 11, 1939 – May 21, 2008) was a Canadian professional ice hockey player who played five games in the National Hockey League for the Pittsburgh Penguins during the 1967–68 season. The rest of his career, which lasted from 1959 to 1973, was spent in various minor leagues. He died in 2008.

Career statistics

Regular season and playoffs

References

External links
 
 Notice of Ted Lanyon's death

1939 births
2008 deaths
Amarillo Wranglers players
Baltimore Clippers players
Buffalo Bisons (AHL) players
Canadian expatriate ice hockey players in the United States
Canadian ice hockey defencemen
Cleveland Barons (1937–1973) players
Greensboro Generals (EHL) players
Johnstown Jets players
Milwaukee Falcons players
Minneapolis Millers (IHL) players
Omaha Knights (CHL) players
Pittsburgh Penguins players
St. Boniface Canadiens players
St. Paul Saints (IHL) players
Southern Hockey League (1973–1977) coaches
Ice hockey people from Winnipeg